John Marshall Watson,  (born 4 May 1946) is a British former racing driver and current commentator from Northern Ireland. He competed in Formula One, winning five Grands Prix and was third in the 1982 championship. He also competed in the World Sportscar Championship finishing second in the 1987 championship. After his retirement from motorsport, he became a commentator for Eurosport's coverage of Formula One from 1989 to 1996. He currently commentates on the GT World Challenge Europe and commentated on the 2022 Miami F1 Grand Prix for F1TV.

Early Formula One career

John Watson was born in Belfast and educated at Rockport School, Northern Ireland. Watson's Formula One career began in 1972, driving a customer March-Cosworth 721 for Goldie Hexagon Racing in a non-Championship event: the World Championship Victory Race at Brands Hatch. Watson's first World Championship events came in the 1973 season, in which he raced in the British Grand Prix in a customer Brabham-Ford BT37, and the US Grand Prix, where he drove the third works Brabham BT42. Neither was particularly successful, as in the British race he ran out of fuel on the 36th lap and his engine failed after only seven laps in the United States event.

Watson scored his first World Championship point in the 1974 Monaco Grand Prix, while driving for Goldie Hexagon Racing. He went on to score a total of six points that season, driving a customer Brabham BT42-Ford modified by the team. He failed to score Championship points the following year, driving for Team Surtees, Team Lotus and Penske Cars. At the 1975 Spanish Grand Prix he had the chance to score his first win. He was in second position, behind Mario Andretti, until he had to stop in the pits for checks after his car started to suffer vibrations. Andretti retired later, and after rejoining the race Watson finished in eighth, his best Championship result in 1975. In non-Championship races he fared somewhat better, taking second place in the Race of Champions at Brands Hatch, and fourth at the International Trophy race at Silverstone.

Rise to prominence
He secured his first World Championship podium with third place at the 1976 French Grand Prix. Later that season came his first victory, driving for Penske in the Austrian Grand Prix having qualified second on the grid. After the race he shaved off his beard, the result of a bet with team owner Roger Penske.

In the third race of the 1977 Formula One season, the South African Grand Prix, he managed to complete the race distance, scored a point, and took his first ever fastest lap. His achievements were overshadowed, however, by the deaths of driver Tom Pryce and a track marshal, Jansen Van Vuuren. His Brabham-Alfa Romeo let him down throughout the season but, despite this, he gained his first pole position in the Monaco Grand Prix and qualified in the top ten no fewer than 14 times, often in the first two rows. Problems with the car, accidents, and a disqualification meant that he raced the full distance in only five of the 17 races. The closest he came to victory was during the French Grand Prix, where he dominated the race from the start only to be let down by a fuel metering problem on the last lap which relegated him to second place behind eventual winner Mario Andretti.

In , Watson managed a more successful season in terms of race finishes, even out-qualifying and out-racing his illustrious teammate Niki Lauda on occasion. He managed three podiums and a pole, and notched up 25 points to earn the highest championship placing of his career to that point.

Move to McLaren and championship challenge

For , Watson moved to McLaren where he gave them their first victory in over three years by winning the 1981 British Grand Prix and also securing the first victory for a carbon fibre composite monocoque F1 car, the McLaren MP4/1. Later in the  season, the strength of the McLaren's carbon fibre monocoque (designed by John Barnard) was demonstrated when he had a fiery crash at Monza during the Italian Grand Prix. Watson lost the car coming out of the high speed Lesmo bends and crashed backwards into the barriers. Similar accidents had previously proven fatal, but Watson was uninjured in an accident he later recalled as looking far worse than it actually was. After James Hunt's abrupt retirement after the Monaco Grand Prix in 1979, Watson was the only full-time competitive British F1 driver up until the end of his career.

In several races he achieved high placings despite qualifying towards the back of the grid. Watson went into the final race of the season at Caesars Palace in with an outside chance of the title, but he was to finish five points adrift of Keke Rosberg and level on points with Didier Pironi.

Watson's final victory also included a fight for position with teammate Niki Lauda, who had started the race 23rd, though Watson ultimately finished 27 seconds ahead of his dual World Championship winning teammate.

At the end of the 1983 season however, Watson was dropped by McLaren and subsequently retired from Formula One. Negotiations with team boss Ron Dennis reportedly broke down when Watson asked for more money than dual World Champion Lauda was earning, citing having won a GP in 1983 where Lauda did not. Dennis instead signed Renault refugee Alain Prost for comparatively little (since he was already under contract to Renault but was fired for 1984). He did return for one further race two years later, driving for McLaren in place of an injured Lauda at the 1985 European Grand Prix at Brands Hatch, in which he qualified 21st and placed seventh in the race (Lauda had injured his wrist in qualifying for the previous race at Spa, forcing him to miss that race also). Watson raced with Lauda's race number of "1" (the Austrian having won the  World Championship). This was only the second occasion since  that a driver other than the reigning World Champion has raced car number 1 in a World Championship race, the other being Ronnie Peterson when the system first began, as reigning World Champion Jackie Stewart had retired upon the conclusion of the 1973 season.

Sportscar career 
In 1984 Watson turned to sports car racing, notably partnering Stefan Bellof to victory at the Fuji 1000 km during Bellof's 1984 Championship year. He was also part of the driver lineup for Bob Tullius' Group 44 Jaguar team at the 1984 24 Hours of Le Mans driving an IMSA spec Jaguar XJR-5 powered by a 6.0 litre V12 in the IMSA / GTP class. In what was Jaguar's first appearance at Le Mans since 1959, Watson briefly took the lead of the race towards the end of the first hour when the faster Porsche 956s and Lancia LC2s pitted. Driving with American Tony Adamowicz and Frenchman Claude Ballot-Léna, they failed to finish the race due to engine trouble though they were classified in 28th place.

Watson also finished second in the 1987 season alongside Jan Lammers in the TWR Silk Cut Jaguar XJR-8 when they won a total of three championship races (Jarama, Monza and Fuji). Watson competed in the 24 Hours of Le Mans seven times over the course of his career between 1973 and 1990, finishing 11th, a career best, in his last start in 1990 driving a Porsche 962C for Richard Lloyd Racing alongside fellow Grand Prix drivers Bruno Giacomelli and Allen Berg.

Other work
After retiring from active racing, he worked as a television commentator, ran a race school at Silverstone and managed a racetrack. He also became the first man to ever test a Jordan Formula One car in 1990.

From 1989 to 1996 he worked as a Formula One commentator for Eurosport alongside Andrew Marriott (1989-1990), Richard Nicholls (1990–1992), Allard Kalff (1992–1994) and Ben Edwards (1995–1996). The last Grand Prix Eurosport broadcast live in the UK was the Japanese GP in 1996. The contracts for Formula One live broadcasts were shifted to private TV stations for 1997. In 1997 Watson worked as a Formula One commentator for ESPN.

From 1998 to 2001 he was Charlie Cox's sidekick in commentating on the British Touring Car Championship for the BBC.

During the 2002 F1 season, Watson co-commentated on Sky Sports' Pay Per View F1+ coverage alongside Ben Edwards. However, this was fairly unpopular and it was axed for the 2003 season.

In 2005–2009, Watson worked as an expert commentator for BSkyb during their broadcasts of the A1 Grand Prix series.

In 2010, Watson commentated on some rounds of the FIA GT1 and GT3 Championship as well as the entire 2014 Blancpain GT Series.

Formula 1 pundit making regular appearances on BBC Radio 5 Live, Radio 4, Sky and the live Sky Sports F1 show on Friday evenings.

Watson currently provides expert commentary on the GT World Challenge Europe alongside regular Blancpain television commentator David Addison.

Legacy
In 2016, in an academic paper that reported a mathematical modelling study that assessed the relative influence of  driver and machine, Watson was ranked the 25th best Formula One driver of all time.

Racing record

Career summary

Complete European Formula Two Championship results
(key) (Races in bold indicate pole position; races in italics indicate fastest lap)

Complete Formula One World Championship results
(key) (Races in bold indicate pole position; races in italics indicate fastest lap)

Complete Formula One Non-Championship results
(key) (races in italics indicate fastest lap)

Complete 24 Hours of Le Mans results

Notes

References

External links 

1946 births
24 Hours of Le Mans drivers
Brabham Formula One drivers
BRDC Gold Star winners
European Formula Two Championship drivers
Formula One drivers from Northern Ireland
Formula One race winners
Goldie Hexagon Racing Formula One drivers
International Race of Champions drivers
Living people
McLaren Formula One drivers
Racing drivers from Northern Ireland
Penske Formula One drivers
People from Bognor Regis
Sportspeople from Belfast
Surtees Formula One drivers
Team Lotus Formula One drivers
World Sportscar Championship drivers
People educated at Rockport School
Motorsport announcers
Japanese Sportscar Championship drivers
Porsche Motorsports drivers
TOM'S drivers
Jaguar Racing drivers